Silver Side Up is the third studio album by Canadian rock band Nickelback, released on September 11, 2001. According to AllMusic, Silver Side Up continued Nickelback's tradition of "dark high-octane rock" from the band's first two albums. It reached number one in Canada, Austria, Ireland, New Zealand, and the United Kingdom. The album was certified 8× Platinum in Canada, 6× Platinum in the US, and 3× Platinum in the UK.

Nickelback toured the world in support of the album, which included their first UK arena tour. After returning from the tour, the band began work on The Long Road.

Background
By 2000, Nickelback  had begun to receive commercial success through performing their 1998 album The State and its lead single "Leader of Men". In early 2001, The State was certified Gold in Canada and had almost reached the same certification in America. At this time, Nickelback was planning to enter the studio to begin recording their third studio album. In March 2001, the band won their first Juno Award for Best New Group of the Year. In April 2001, they returned to the studio where The State was made, to begin recording Silver Side Up. Many of the songs from Silver Side Up were written before The State was released; some of them, including "Hangnail" and "Hollywood," had been played live and many fans already knew them before Silver Side Up was released. "Just For" was originally released on Curb as "Just Four" in 1996. According to Chad Kroeger during a Vegas concert in 2018, "Where Do I Hide?" is about a friend of his who would bust out of prison all the time and go back to Nickelback's hometown of Hanna, Alberta.

Nickelback took their time recording Silver Side Up, and eventually hired Rick Parashar to help them produce the album. By June 2001, the band had completed the record; they announced the lead single would be "How You Remind Me". Mike Kroeger, the bass player, wanted to release "Never Again", but the record label and bandmates decided "How You Remind Me" would be more appropriate. In July 2001, Nickelback sent "How You Remind Me" to rock radio stations. In August that year, Nickelback played their first German tour. In early September, the band set out to tour with their friends 3 Doors Down. While on tour, "How You Remind Me" reached number one on both the Billboard Mainstream Rock Tracks chart and the Modern Rock Tracks chart before Silver Side Up was officially released. The success of the album's lead single catapulted their previous album The State back onto the Billboard charts.

Release and chart performance
Silver Side Up was released on September 11, 2001. The album entered the Billboard 200, peaking at number two behind The Blueprint by American rapper Jay-Z and surpassing Nickelback's previous album, The State, which peaked at 130. Silver Side Up peaked at number 2 in the Billboard 200 and number 1 in the Canadian albums chart, becoming Nickelback's first album to enter the Canadian albums chart. The band decided to tour with Default and others in late 2001. Silver Side Up received Platinum status from the RIAA, becoming Nickelback's first album to garner that distinction. In Canada, it also reached Platinum status, surpassing The State, which went Gold in January 2001.

In December 2001, "How You Remind Me" peaked at number one in the Billboard Hot 100, where it remained for four weeks. The song stayed in the top ten of the Billboard Hot 100 for 20 consecutive weeks. By the end of 2001, Silver Side Up had been awarded Double Platinum status by the RIAA. Follow-up singles were "Too Bad" and "Never Again", both of which reached number one on the rock charts, but failed to achieve the same success as "How You Remind Me".

In 2002, Nickelback toured worldwide to support Silver Side Up; they filmed a concert in their home province of Alberta, which the band released on DVD as Live at Home. The band won many Juno Awards and several Billboard Music Awards. "How You Remind Me" became the number one song of the Hot 100 of the year for 2002. By early 2003, the band was nominated for the American Music Awards. Nickelback also played at the American Music Awards. Silver Side Up was certified 6x Multi Platinum by the RIAA and 8x Multi Platinum by the CRIA.

In the United Kingdom, the album has sold over 1,117,000 copies as of June 2017.

Reception
As of December 22, 2010, the album had sold 5,666,000 copies in the U.S. According to IFPI, over 2,000,000 copies were sold in Europe and over 8,000,000 were sold worldwide by 2002. It was ranked 47th on Billboard'''s 200 Albums of the Decade.

The album received mixed reviews from critics. Rolling Stone critic Matt Diehl gave the album two out of five stars, stating, "Nearly every song seems trapped in the amber of early-Nineties Seattle aesthetics, the sonic equivalent of too many unfortunate goatees."

Track listing

Re-recording of "Just Four" from Curb (1996)

Personnel

Nickelback
 Chad Kroeger – Lead vocals, lead guitar (guitar solo on "Too Bad", "Hollywood", and "Where Do I Hide"), talk-box on "Woke Up This Morning"
 Ryan Peake – Rhythm guitar, backing vocals
 Mike Kroeger – Bass guitar
 Ryan Vikedal – Drums, percussion

Additional musicians
 Ian Thornley – Slide guitar on "Good Times Gone"

Artwork
 Daniel Moss – Photography
 www.amoebacorp.com – Album Design, Illustration

Production
 Rick Parashar – Producer
 Randy Staub – Mixing at Armoury Studios, Vancouver, BC
 Geoff Ott – Digital editing
 George Marino – Mastering at Sterling Sound, NYC
 Joey Moi – Engineer
 Pat "Sajak" Sharman – Assistant engineer
 Alex Aligizakis – Assistant mixing engineer, Pro Tools operator
 Kristina Ardron & Kevin Fairbairn – Assistant engineers

Charts

Weekly charts

Year-end charts

Decade-end charts

Certifications and sales

Appearances
 The song "Never Again" was featured as downloadable content for the video game Rock Band in 2010.
 The song "How You Remind Me" was featured in the procedural drama Third Watch (season 3 episode 7) in 2001 during the opening closing credits, as well as in the video game Guitar Hero: Warriors of Rock in 2010 and as downloadable content for Rock Band'' in 2011.

References

2001 albums
Nickelback albums
Roadrunner Records albums
Albums produced by Rick Parashar
Albums recorded at Greenhouse Studios
Juno Award for Rock Album of the Year albums